Jack Rabbit Blues is a compilation album of recordings by musician Ike Turner released on Secret Records in 2011. The packaging includes a 31 track CD plus a 10-inch vinyl.

In the 1950s, Turner discovered many blues musicians when he was a talent scout. He was also a bandleader and a session musician. This compilation is a selection of recordings that Turner composed and/or played on between 1958 and 1960. The artist featured in this compilation include Kenneth Churchill, Otis Rush, Betty Everett, Buddy Guy and his own band the Kings of Rhythm. It also includes the first recording of his future wife Tina Turner (Little Ann).

Track listing 
All tracks written by Ike Turner except where noted. Each track features Turner either on guitar, piano and/or vocals.

10 inch vinyl

References 

2011 compilation albums
Blues compilation albums
Ike Turner albums
Rock-and-roll albums
Blues rock compilation albums
Rhythm and blues compilation albums